According to traditional Chinese uranography, the modern constellation Lupus is located within the eastern quadrant of the sky, which is symbolized as the Azure Dragon of the East (東方青龍, Dōng Fāng Qīng Lóng).

The name of the western constellation in modern Chinese is 豺狼座 (chái láng zuò), meaning "the dhole constellation".

Stars
The map of Chinese constellation in constellation Lupus area consists of:

See also
Traditional Chinese star names
Chinese constellations

References

External links
Lupus – Chinese associations
 香港太空館研究資源
 中國星區、星官及星名英譯表
 天象文學
 台灣自然科學博物館天文教育資訊網
 中國古天文
 中國古代的星象系統

Astronomy in China
Lupus (constellation)